The American Dam, or American Diversion Dam, is a diversion dam on the Rio Grande in El Paso, Texas, that divides the river water between Mexico and the U.S.  It is about  north of the point where the west bank of the river enters Mexico,  from the business center.  The dam is operated by the International Boundary and Water Commission.
It started operation in 1938.

Origins

The dam has its origins in the 21 May 1906 treaty between the United States and Mexico for "an equitable distribution of the waters of the Rio Grande."
This guaranteed Mexico up to  annually, with the Americans taking the rest, 
except in time of drought when the shares would be reduced on a percentage basis.

To ensure that they got their agreed share, in 1935 Congress authorized construction of the American Dam, 

Location

The dam is part of the Rio Grande Project. Beyond the ruins at Fort Quitman the Rio Grande riverbed is often dry until the confluence of the Rio Conchos.

The location at the corner of Texas, New Mexico, and Mexico puts the dam in an area sensitive to border issues.  In 2019, the private group We Build The Wall built a half-mile section of border wall extending west from the dam into New Mexico, with a locked gate on federal land by the dam, which blocks access to Monument One on the border, and to part of the levee. The International Boundary and Water Commission cut the lock and locked the gate open to preserve their access to the road along the riverbank by the dam.

Structure

The American Dam was built in 1937–1938 at a cost to the United States Government of $667,398.
Water is diverted into the American Canal over a weir, parallel to the general course of the river, with intake controlled by two radial gates.

Downstream canals

The American Canal runs along the north bank of the Rio Grande for two miles, then delivers water into the Rio Grande American Canal Extension (RGACE).
By the late 1990s the original American Canal was in poor condition, particularly in the open sections, and operating well below its original planned capacity.

The cement-lined RGACE replaced part of the earthen Franklin Canal, which delivered water through the city of El Paso to farms in El Paso’s Lower Valley.
The RGACE, built from 1997 to 1998, was designed to carry  of water.
During planning for the RGACE the Mexicans expressed interest in having their  allotment delivered from the end of the RGACE near Riverside Dam, rather than to the head of the Acequia Madre just below the American Dam, as at present.
The water would be delivered via a siphon underneath the Rio Grande.

References
Citations

Sources

 

Buildings and structures in El Paso County, Texas
Dams in New Mexico
Buildings and structures in Doña Ana County, New Mexico
Dams completed in 1935
United States local public utility dams
Dams on the Rio Grande
1935 establishments in Texas
Dams in Texas
1935 establishments in New Mexico